Atbulaq (also, Atbulak) is a village and municipality in the Hajigabul Rayon of Azerbaijan.  It has a population of 3,175.  The municipality consists of the villages of Atbulaq and Kürdçü.

References 

Populated places in Hajigabul District